The Municipality of Benedikt is a municipality in northeastern Slovenia. Its seat is the settlement of Benedikt. Before 1 January 1999 it was part of the Municipality of Lenart. It lies in the Slovene Hills. The area is part of the traditional region of Styria. It is now included in the Drava Statistical Region.

Settlements
In addition to the municipal seat of Benedikt, the municipality also includes the following settlements:

 Drvanja
 Ihova
 Ločki Vrh
 Negovski Vrh
 Obrat
 Spodnja Bačkova
 Spodnja Ročica
 Štajngrova
 Stara Gora
 Sveti Trije Kralji v Slovenskih Goricah
 Trotkova
 Trstenik

References

External links

Benedikt municipal site
Municipality of Benedikt on Geopedia

 
Benedikt
1998 establishments in Slovenia